The FPSO Noble Seillean was a dynamically positioned floating oil production, storage and offloading vessel.

Etymology
The name Seillean means "honeybee" in Gaelic.

History
The vessel was designated as a single-well oil production ship (SWOPS) when constructed for BP by Harland and Wolff in 1986-1988.  

The process plant, flare and the riser including subsea connection were designed and procured by Matthew Hall Engineering, which also provided construction assistance and commissioning of the oil production facilities. The original specification for the vessel was as follows:

 Production capability - 15,000 barrels of oil per day, 10,000 barrels of produced water per day, 6 million standard cubic metres of gas per day
 Production train - 1 train, 2 stages, 1st stage separator pressure 17 barg
 Storage capacity - 318,000 barrels
 Living accommodation - 45 berths

The vessel was originally designed for a generic North Sea field well, although it was later assigned the Cyrus oilfield on Block 16/28 in the UK sector of the North Sea. Later she served on the Donan field. Seillean was sold by BP in 1993 to Reading & Bates. Brazilian oil company Petrobras signed a four-year charter for Seillean to develop the Roncador field. Seillean was upgraded and arrived in Brazil in December 1998.

After acquisition of Reading & Bates by Transocean, the vessel was acquired by Frontier Drilling in 2002. She was moved to Jubarte field. In February 2006, the vessel started to operate in the Petrobras-operated Golfinho Field in the Espirito Santo Basin off Brazil.  In 2007, Seillean was moved to Pipa 2 oilfield.

In June 2010, Seillean was contracted for oil collection and processing at the Macondo Prospect to deal with the Deepwater Horizon oil spill.

With the purchase of Frontier Drilling in 2010, Seillean was acquired by Noble Corporation. She was renamed Noble Seillean and her flag was changed from Panama to Liberia.

Seillean was sent for scrapping to Alang, India, on 26 September 2015.

Description

FPSO Seallean was a dynamically positioned monohull floating production, storage and offloading vessel. She was classed by Lloyd's Register of Shipping as a 100A1 Oil Processing Tanker. Seallean was equipped with a flare, two cargo-handling cranes, a process plant inside the hull, a completion tower, and crew accommodation.

Seillean was powered by a hybrid system of three Ruston gas turbine of 3.3 MW each, and three MAN diesel driven generators 4.2 MW each.  These were operated such that when fuel gas was available from production operations, the gas turbine generators generate electrical power. When fuel gas was unavailable, the diesel driven generators provided the power, supplemented by the gas turbine driven generators operating on diesel oil.

Seillean had the following production facilities:
 processing plant.
A 6-5/8" riser which can connect to a subsea wellhead.
                            
The crude oil was pumped from the process plant to six cargo oil tanks. During the 1998 upgrade, an offtake reel system was installed which allows ship discharge of cargo to a dynamically positioned shuttle tanker.

References

External links
 Seillean website

 
Floating production storage and offloading vessels
Ships of BP
1988 ships
Ships of Liberia
Ships built in Belfast
Ships built by Harland and Wolff